Tom a' Chòinich is a mountain in the Northwest Highlands of Scotland. Glen Affric is to the south and Loch Mullardoch to the north. Less than 1 kilometre (0.5 mi) to the west is the  Munro Top called Tom a' Chòinich Beag. This mountain should not be confused with the  Munro Top also called Tom a' Chòinnich near Ben Wyvis.

Although the mountain can be climbed from Glen Cannich, an approach from Glen Affric is more straightforward using a path that goes northwest from the north shore of Loch Beinn a' Mheadhoin following Gleann nam Fiadh upstream. This path crosses Bealach Toll Easa which used to be the pass on the route from Affric Lodge to Benula Lodge before the latter was inundated by the creation of the reservoir at Loch Mullardoch. The southeast ridge is more direct but it is rocky at its lower levels.

See also 
 List of Munro mountains
 Mountains and hills of Scotland

References

Citations

Works cited

Munros
Mountains and hills of the Central Highlands
Mountains and hills of Highland (council area)
One-thousanders of Scotland